Grisette Mountain is a  mountain summit located in Jasper National Park in Alberta, Canada. It is located in the Colin Range, which is a sub-range of the Canadian Rockies. Its nearest higher peak is Mount Dromore,  to the east.

Grisette Mountain was named in 1916 by Morrison P. Bridgland for its gray colored limestone. Bridgland (1878-1948) was a Dominion Land Surveyor who named many peaks in Jasper Park and the Canadian Rockies. The French word gris translates to gray. The mountain's name was officially adopted in 1947 by the Geographical Names Board of Canada.


Climate
Based on the Köppen climate classification, Grisette Mountain is located in a subarctic climate with cold, snowy winters, and mild summers. Temperatures can drop below -20 °C with wind chill factors below -30 °C. In terms of favorable weather, June through September are the best months to climb. Precipitation runoff from Grisette Mountain flows into tributaries of the Maligne River and Rocky River, which are both tributaries of the Athabasca River.

See also
 Geography of Alberta

References

External links
 Parks Canada web site: Jasper National Park

Two-thousanders of Alberta
Canadian Rockies
Mountains of Jasper National Park